The 1997–98 season was the 63rd season for Real Zaragoza in its history. The club competed in La Liga and Copa del Rey.

Summary
During summer Alfonso Solans in his 6th season as President, reinforced the squad with several players such as midfielders Nordin Wooter from AFC Ajax,  Jose Ignacio from Valencia CF, Roberto Acuña, Defender Gary Sundgren and forwards Yordi and Pier. Meanwhile, the club transferred out Gus Poyet to Chelsea FC after 7 years, youngstar forward Fernando Morientes and Dani were sold to Real Madrid. Also, forwards Higuera and Miguel Pardeza along Nayim left the club after several seasons.

In his 2nd season as head coach Luis Costa did fix the defensive line with decent performances of Sundgren, on the midfield the Dutch midfielder Nordin Wooter was a total flop being surpassed as starter by Jose Ignacio on the right wing, on the contrary, the other midfielders Kily Gonzalez, Santiago Aragon and Roberto Acuña did cover in a decent way the departures of Gus Poyet and Nayim.  Costa found troubles at the offensive line with new arrivals Yordi and Pier delivering poor performances -prompting the arrival of Paulo Jamelli during Winter-, the team only reached the mid-table spots even far away to play the upcoming 1998 UEFA Intertoto Cup finishing in a 13th spot. The season is remembered by the match won by the squad against Real Madrid 0-2 at Santiago Bernabeu Stadium after 13 seasons only the 2nd league victory over there in its club history.  

Meanwhile, in Copa del Rey the squad advanced to the semifinals only to be defeated by FC Barcelona.

Squad

Transfers

Winter

La Liga

League table

Position by round

Matches

Copa del Rey

Eightfinals

Quarterfinals

Semifinals

Statistics

Players statistics

References

Real Zaragoza seasons
Spanish football clubs 1997–98 season